Aqqur was a Palestinian Arab hamlet in the Jerusalem Subdistrict. It was depopulated during the 1948 Arab-Israeli War on July 13, 1948, under Operation Dani. It was located 14.5 km west of Jerusalem on the Wadi Isma'il, a tributary of the Wadi al-Sarar.

History
In 1838, in the Ottoman era, Akur was noted as a Muslim village, in the el-Arkub district, southwest of Jerusalem. In 1856 the village noted by the same name on Kiepert's map of Palestine published that year.

In 1863, Victor Guérin found here a village with 200 inhabitants. He further noted that several of the houses contained some stones from an old church, then totally destroyed, but whose location still retained among the inhabitants the name of Kniseh (church). A well, which passed for antiquity although it was badly constructed, was sufficient to all the needs of this small locality.

An Ottoman village list of about 1870 showed that Aqqur had 38 houses and a population of 140, though the population count included men, only.

In 1883, the PEF's Survey of Western Palestine described Akur: "A small village on the ledge of the ridge, surrounded by very rugged ground. There is a good spring on the north east, about a mile from the village, on the same ridge."

In 1896 the population of 'Akur was estimated to be about 132 persons.

British Mandate era
In the 1922 census of Palestine, conducted by the British Mandate authorities, Aqur had a population 25, all Muslims, while in the 1931 census, it was counted with Ras Abu 'Ammar and Ein Hubin, and together they had a population of 488 Muslims, in 106 houses.

A British anthropologist, writing in 1932, reported that there was a group of Sidr trees north east of the village believed to be protected by spirits.

In the 1945 statistics, it had a population of 40 Muslims, with a total of 5,522 dunums of land. Of this, 174 dunams were used for irrigable land or plantations, 653 for cereals, while 5 dunams were built-up land.

'Aqqur had a maqam for a local sage known as al-Shaykh Ahmad Sulayman.

1948, aftermath
The village was depopulated July 13–14, 1948 by Harel Brigade units. There had been fighting around the village since April, and many people had fled. Those who remained were expelled.

References

Bibliography

External links
Welcome To 'Aqqur
'Aqqur, Zochrot
Survey of Western Palestine, Map 17: IAA, Wikimedia commons 
'Aqqur, from the Khalil Sakakini Cultural Center
'Aqqur Palestine Family.net 

Arab villages depopulated during the 1948 Arab–Israeli War
District of Jerusalem